Gliese 180 (often shortened to GJ 180), is a small red dwarf star in the equatorial constellation of Eridanus. It is invisible to the naked eye with an apparent visual magnitude of 10.9. The star is located at a distance of 39 light years from the Sun based on parallax, and is drifting closer with a radial velocity of −14.6 km/s. It has a high proper motion, traversing the sky at the rate of  per year.

The stellar classification of GJ 180 is catalogued as M2V or M3V, depending on the study, which indicates this is a dim red dwarf – an M-type main-sequence star that is generating energy by core hydrogen fusion. Reiners and associates (2012) do not consider it to be an active star. It is about five billion years old and is spinning with a projected rotational velocity of ~3 km/s, giving it a rotation period of about 65 days. The star has 43% of the Sun's mass and 42% of the radius of the Sun. It is radiating just 2.4% of the luminosity of the Sun from its photosphere at an effective temperature of 3,634 K.

Planetary system
Gliese 180 is known to have at least two exoplanets, designated Gliese 180 b and Gliese 180 d, and possibly a third, Gliese 180 c; all are super-Earths or mini-Neptunes. Planets 'b' and 'c' were initially reported in 2014, and a follow-up study in 2020 confirmed planet 'b' and found a new planet 'd', but did not find the previously claimed planet 'c'. According to the 2014 study, planets 'b' and 'c' have an orbital period ratio of 7:5, which suggests a mean motion resonance that is stabilizing the orbits.

According to the Planetary Habitability Laboratory (PHL) in Puerto Rico, both b and c worlds in the system may be classifiable as potentially habitable planets. Planets Gliese 180 b and Gliese 180 c have minimum masses of 6.4 and 8.3 Earth masses, respectively. However, Dr Mikko Tuomi, of the UK's University of Hertfordshire, whose team identified the planets, disagreed, stating:

"The PHL adds some sort of an “extended HZ”, which I, frankly, do not know how it’s calculated, but that adds some areas of potential habitability to the inner and outer edges of the HZ as we have defined it. They included the inner companion of the GJ 180 system (planet b) that we consider too hot to be potentially habitable.”

However, as of 2022, the PHL lists only planets c and d, not b, as potentially habitable.

References

M-type main-sequence stars
Planetary systems with two confirmed planets
Eridanus (constellation)
J04534995-1746235
0180
022762